Alpha Brumage (March 16, 1880 – March 11, 1963) was an American football player and coach of football, basketball, and baseball.

Early life and playing career
Brumage was a native of Beloit, Kansas and graduated from Beloit High School. He attended the University of Kansas, where he played college football from 1901 to 1903 as a fullback and captained the 1903 Kansas Jayhawks football team. Brumage also participated in track and field as Kansas, running the hurdles in 1902–03.

Coaching career

Ottawa
Brumage was the second head football at Ottawa University in Ottawa, Kansas and he held that position for four seasons, from 1904 until 1907. His coaching record at Ottawa was 14–16–1. Brumage took over the team after a one-year hiatus because the school was attempting to purge professionalism from their college sports teams.

VMI
After coaching at William Jewell College in Liberty, Missouri and Nebraska State Normal School—now known as Peru State College—Brumage moved to Lexington, Virginia to become the tenth head football coach at the Virginia Military Institute (VMI). He held that position for two seasons, from 1911 until 1912. His career coaching record at VMI was 13–2.

Kentucky
Brumage then went to Kentucky where he was football coach from 1913 to 1914, compiling an 11–5 record, and basketball coach from 1913 to 1915, compiling a 19–7 record.

Late life and death
In September 1915, Brumage was appointed as the physical director of the Birmingham Athletic Club in Birmingham, Alabama. During World War I, Brumage attended officer's training school and was promoted to the rank of major in the United States Army. He served in France with the 322nd Field Artillery Regiment of the 83rd Infantry Division.

Brumage retired to San Antonio in the early 1940s. He died there on March 11, 1963.

Head coaching record

Football

Basketball

References

External links
 

1880 births
1963 deaths
American football fullbacks
American male hurdlers
Kansas Jayhawks football players
Kansas Jayhawks men's track and field athletes
Kentucky Wildcats baseball coaches
Kentucky Wildcats football coaches
Kentucky Wildcats men's basketball coaches
Ottawa Braves football coaches
Peru State Bobcats football coaches
Peru State Bobcats men's basketball coaches
VMI Keydets football coaches
VMI Keydets basketball coaches
William Jewell Cardinals baseball coaches
William Jewell Cardinals football coaches
William Jewell Cardinals men's basketball coaches
United States Army officers
United States Army personnel of World War I
People from Beloit, Kansas
Sportspeople from San Antonio
Coaches of American football from Kansas
Players of American football from Kansas
Players of American football from San Antonio
Baseball coaches from Kansas
Basketball coaches from Kansas
Track and field athletes from Kansas
Track and field athletes from San Antonio
Military personnel from Kansas